Engawala is a small town in the Northern Territory, Australia, located  north of Alice Springs.

It falls within the local government area of the Central Desert Regional Council, the governing land council is the Central Land Council.

References

Towns in the Northern Territory
Central Desert Region
Aboriginal communities in the Northern Territory